Hippotion rafflesii, the Raffles' striated hawkmoth, is a moth of the family Sphingidae. It is known from Sri Lanka, southern and eastern India, Nepal, Myanmar, Thailand, southern China, Malaysia (Peninsular), Indonesia (Sumatra, Java, Sulawesi) and the Philippines.

Description
The wingspan is 56–70 mm.

Subspecies
Hippotion rafflesii rafflesii
Hippotion rafflesii dyokeae Hogenes & Treadaway, 1998 (Philippines)

References

 Pinhey, E. (1962): Hawk Moths of Central and Southern Africa. Longmans Southern Africa, Cape Town.

Hippotion
Moths described in 1858